Top City is a shopping mall located in the 7th Redevelopment Zone of Xitun District, Taichung, Taiwan that opened on 22 December 2011. The mall is owned and operated by the Far Eastern Group. Main core stores of the mall include Tissot, Hermes, Bvlgari, Gap, Nike and various other high end brands and themed restaurants. In March 2021, the second authorized Lego store in Taiwan opened in the mall.

Public Transportation
The mall is located in close proximity to Taichung City Hall metro station, which is served by the Green line of the Taichung Metro.

Gallery

See also
 List of tourist attractions in Taiwan
 Big City (shopping mall)
 Mega City (shopping mall)

References

External links

Official Website

2011 establishments in Taiwan
Shopping malls in Taichung
Shopping malls established in 2011